Endoumeni Pass, is situated in the KwaZulu-Natal province of South Africa on the road between Dundee and Wasbank.

References

Mountain passes of KwaZulu-Natal